Hà Đức Chinh (born September 22, 1997) is a Vietnamese professional footballer who plays as a forward for Topeland Bình Định and the Vietnam national team.

International goals

U-20
Scores and results list Vietnam's goal tally first.

U-22
Scores and results list Vietnam's goal tally first. Only results against national teams were counted

U-23
Scores and results list Vietnam's goal tally first. Only results against national teams were counted

Honours
Than Quảng Ninh
V.League 2: Runner-up 2016
Vietnam U23
AFC U-23 Championship Runners-up  2018
Southeast Asian Games: 2019
Vietnam 
AFF Championship: 2018
King's Cup: Runner-up 2019

References 

1997 births
Living people
Vietnamese footballers
Association football forwards
V.League 1 players
SHB Da Nang FC players
Than Quang Ninh FC players
People from Phú Thọ province
Association football wingers
Footballers at the 2018 Asian Games
2019 AFC Asian Cup players
Competitors at the 2017 Southeast Asian Games
Asian Games competitors for Vietnam
Competitors at the 2019 Southeast Asian Games
Southeast Asian Games medalists in football
Southeast Asian Games gold medalists for Vietnam
Vietnam international footballers